Pizzo Lucendro is a  mountain in the Lepontine Alps, located on the border between the cantons of Uri and Ticino. It overlooks St. Gotthard Pass and Lake Lucendro on its east side.

References

External links
Pizzo Lucendro on Summitpost

Mountains of the Alps
Mountains of Ticino
Ticino–Uri border
Lepontine Alps
Mountains of Switzerland